McBusted's Most Excellent Adventure Tour is a 2015 concert tour by English supergroup McBusted, composed of members of pop rock bands McFly and Busted.

Background
The second McBusted tour, to support their debut self-titled album. On 4 November 2014, the band posted on their Twitter and Facebook pages: "It's possibly the worst kept secret in entertainment, but we are so stoked to announce the #McBusted2015Tour!!!" On 26 January 2015, on their website, they announced that the tour would be called McBusted's Most Excellent Adventure Tour. The tour lasted from 12 March to 22 April 2015, consisting of 21 shows. McBusted were also the support act for the Australian and European legs of One Direction's On the Road Again Tour in 2015. During the Australian dates, McBusted announced and performed two of their own gigs, one in Sydney and one in Melbourne. A music video was shot for their song "Get Over It" in 2014 with the intention of releasing it as a single the next year. However James Bourne confirmed on Twitter that the release was scrapped. A DVD and Blu-ray release of the 2015 tour, McBusted's Most Excellent Adventure Tour – Live at the O2, was released on 22 June 2015 and reached number one in the music video charts. The name of the tour is likely a reference to the 1989 comedy Bill & Ted's Excellent Adventure.

Support acts
Symmetry
New City Kings
Hometown

Tour dates

Setlist
Main stage:
 "Air Guitar"
 "Hate Your Guts"
 "One for the Radio"
 "Thunderbirds Are Go"
 "Get Over It"
 "You Said No"
 "3AM"
 "What Happened to Your Band?" 
B – Stage:
 "Air Hostess" 
 "What I Go to School For" 
 "Obviously" 
 "Beautiful Girls Are the Loneliest"
"Here Comes The Bride" Interlude:
 "Crashed the Wedding"
 "Riding on My Bike"
 "All About You"
 "Star Girl"
Encore:
 "5 Colours in Her Hair"
 "Shine a Light"
 "Year 3000"

Note:
 At Nottingham Capital FM Arena on the 19th of April, Crashed The Wedding followed What Happened To Your Band? but the rest of the set list remained the same thereafter. There was no "B-Stage" at this date, which is the reason for the set list change.
 During "Riding On My Bike", James rides a bicycle on stage throwing T-shirts into the audience.
 During the interlude to the B – Stage, The band descends onto the B – Stage in the same Delorean used for opening sequence of the McBusted Tour.

References

External links
McBusted website
McBusted on Twitter

2015 concert tours
McFly
Busted (band)
Co-headlining concert tours
2015 in British music
Concert tours of the United Kingdom
Concert tours of Ireland